Oxamide is the organic compound with the formula . This white crystalline solid is soluble in ethanol, slightly soluble in water and insoluble in diethyl ether. Oxamide is the diamide derived from oxalic acid, and the hydrate of cyanogen.

Preparation
Oxamide is produced from hydrogen cyanide, which is oxidized to cyanogen, which is then hydrolyzed. 

It can also be prepared from formamide by glow-discharge electrolysis.

Application
The main application is as a substitute for urea in fertilizers. Oxamide hydrolyzes (releases ammonia) very slowly, which is sometimes preferred vs the quick release by urea.

It is used as a stabilizer for nitrocellulose preparations. It also finds use in APCP rocket motors as a high performance burn rate suppressant. The use of oxamide in concentrations of 1-3 wt% has shown to slow the linear burn rate while having minimal impact on propellant specific impulse.

N,N'-substituted oxamides are supporting ligands for the copper-catalyzed amination and amidation of aryl halides in (Ullmann-Goldberg reaction), including relatively unreactive aryl chloride substrates.

Reactions
It dehydrates above 350 °C releasing cyanogen. Oxamide derivatives form self-assembled monolayers consisting of a hydrogen bonded network.

References

Carboxamides